Sitalcicus gardineri is an extinct species of harvestmen in the family Podoctidae. The species was endemic to Mahe Island of Seychelles.

References

Endemic fauna of Seychelles
Animals described in 1911
Harvestmen
Extinct arachnids
Extinct invertebrates since 1500